Celal Emir Dede (born 2 May 2001) is a Turkish professional footballer who plays as a winger.

Professional career
A youth product of Balıkesirspor, Dede began his senior career with the club in the TFF First League in 2018. On 1 February 2021, he transferred to Çaykur Rizespor. He made his senior debut with Çaykur Rizespor in a 2-0 Süper Lig loss to İstanbul Başakşehir on 15 May 2021.

References

External links
 
 

2001 births
Sportspeople from Balıkesir
Living people
Turkish footballers
Turkey youth international footballers
Association football wingers
Balıkesirspor footballers
Çaykur Rizespor footballers
Uşakspor footballers
Süper Lig players
TFF First League players
TFF Second League players